General elections were held in Monaco on 16 July 1933 to elect the 12 members of the National Council. The national councilmen were elected by a 30-member Electoral College.

Electoral College 
The 30-member Electoral College consisted of nine members elected by the Communal Council and 21 members elected by voters. The Electoral College also includes three substitute members elected by the Communal Council and six substitute members elected by voters.

Members elected by Communal Council 
The Communal Council held an election for nine members and three substitute members of the Electoral Council on 24 June 1933.

Members elected by voters 
An election of the remaining 21 Electoral College members and six substitute members was held on 25 June 1933.

Results

References

Elections in Monaco
Monaco
Parliamentary election
July 1933 events in Europe